"The Joker Goes to School", a first-season episode of the Batman television series, first aired on ABC March 2, 1966 as its 15th episode, with an encore telecast later occurring on August 10. It guest starred Cesar Romero as The Joker.

Lorenzo Semple Jr. gives a subtle backstory for the Joker: when Batman shows the Joker's mugshot to the kids, the Joker is wearing a normal suit, and there is a reference to him being a "master of disguise", leading one to believe this version wears clown makeup (not unlike Heath Ledger's version in The Dark Knight), instead of having his skin discolored by chemicals (as was the original comics character and the Jack Nicholson version in Tim Burton's 1989 film).

In November 1965, Semple concocted a new villain named The One-Armed Bandit, "whose peculiar kick is gimmicked coin machines of all sorts". The idea ultimately wound up in these episodes with Joker in charge of The One Armed Bandit Novelty Company and vending machines that churned out silver dollars, quarters, answer sheets to exams, and knockout gas.

The Joker originally was scheduled to be the first villain to appear, but a scheduling conflict prevented Cesar Romero from appearing on the debut episode.

Plot synopsis
The Joker, attempts to undermine student morale at Woodrow Roosevelt High School in order to recruit high school dropouts for his gang of "Bad Pennies" by rigging the school vending machines to give out silver dollars and negotiable stocks and bonds instead of milk. Alerted by Commissioner James Gordon, Batman races out to the school; an immediate assembly is made by the school's student leaders, including Richard "Dick" Grayson, Pete, and Susie, the school's head cheerleader.

Batman shows up to show slides of mug shots of The Joker, when suddenly, out of the blue, he pops up right in full view of everyone. Batman attempts to arrest him for loitering on school grounds, but the Joker manages to get off on a mere technicality. Meanwhile, across Gotham City, a bar is held up by a gimmicked jukebox which when activated spouts a double-barrel shotgun; then two stocking-masked hoodlums, actually two of Joker's henchmen, Nick and Two-Bits (both high school dropouts), rush in to rob the bar's receipts from the register.

The Joker reconvenes with Nick and Two-Bits at their hideout, the "One-Armed Bandit Novelty Company"; unbeknownst to everyone else, Susie is also the Joker's henchwoman. She arranges to swipe some important exam papers so The Joker can use them in a blackmail scheme, and also leads Batman and Robin into a trap set by the Joker. He and his henchmen snag Batman and Robin with one of the rigged vending machines which, instead of giving out silver dollars, locks them in shackles and emits sleeping gas.

Batman and Robin are transferred to the inside of a moving van, where they are strapped to electric chairs; on the wall is a slot machine, which when activated will win them their freedom and $50,000 cash with 3 liberty bells; just their freedom with 3 oranges, and instant and inescapable 50,000 lethal volts of electricity with 3 lemons, automatically on the last lemon. As bad luck would have it, 2 lemons have turned up already...

Cliffhanger text
HORRORS!! ONE LEMON!!
DOUBLE HORRORS!! DOUBLE HORRORS!! TWO LEMONS!!
AND IF IT'S A THIRD...INSTANT AND INESCAPABLE 50,000 VOLTS!!
CLOSE YOUR EYES! WHO DARES TO SEE IT?? TRY US TOMORROW! SAME BAT-TIME!! SAME BAT-CHANNEL!!

Notes
 This episode is the origin of the names of "Harmless Junk, Inc." and "Citywide Hoop Champs, Inc.", respectively the companies under which The Brothers Chaps produce Homestar Runner and Two More Eggs. It is also the origin of the "No Loafing" sign that can be seen in various Homestar Runner shorts, as well as the inspiration for Strong Bad's costume in "Halloween Fairstival", the Halloween special of 2004.
 “Nick”, one of The Joker’s henchmen, is plagued by Kip King (Née Jerome Charles Kattan), who is the father of turn of the century Saturday Night Live star Chris Katan.

References

External links
 

Batman (TV series) episodes
1966 American television episodes
Joker (character) in other media